Paama Airport  is an airport on Paama island, in the Malampa Province of Vanuatu.

Airlines and destinations

References 

Airports in Vanuatu
Malampa Province